14th London Film Critics Circle Awards
1994

Film of the Year: 
 The Piano 

British Film of the Year: 
 The Remains of the Day 

The 14th London Film Critics Circle Awards, honouring the best in film for 1993, were announced by the London Film Critics Circle in 1994.

Winners
Film of the Year
The Piano

British Film of the Year
The Remains of the Day

Foreign Language Film of the Year
Un Coeur en Hiver • France

Director of the Year
James Ivory – The Remains of the Day

British Director of the Year
Ken Loach – Raining Stones

Screenwriter of the Year
Harold Ramis and Danny Rubin – Groundhog Day

British Screenwriter of the Year
Roddy Doyle – The Snapper

Actor of the Year
Anthony Hopkins – The Remains of the Day

Actress of the Year
Holly Hunter – The Piano

British Actor of the Year
David Thewlis – Naked

British Actress of the Year
Miranda Richardson – Damage

Newcomer of the Year
Quentin Tarantino – Reservoir Dogs

British Newcomer of the Year
Vadim Jean and Gary Sinyor – Leon the Pig Farmer

British Technical Achievement of the Year
Ken Adam – Addams Family Values

British Producer of the Year
Kenneth Branagh – Much Ado About Nothing

Special Achievement Award
Kate Maberly – The Secret Garden

Dilys Powell Award
Christopher Lee

External links
IMDB
Official Website

1
1993 film awards
1993 in London
1993 in British cinema